Rowntree Park is a  park in York, England open to the public, featuring children's playgrounds, tennis courts, bowling greens, basketball court, skateboarding area and general areas for picnicking. The park also features a large lake, a canal and a water cascade, and is home to many ducks, swans and Canada geese. The park's outdoor swimming pool was demolished in the face of strong public protest in the 1980s.

It was created in memory of employees of Rowntree's who died in World War I, and was opened in July 1921 by local entrepreneur and philanthropist Joseph Rowntree.  The gates at the riverbank entrance are eighteenth-century and were given by the company as a memorial to the people of York who died in World War II. Rowntree Park celebrated its 85th anniversary on 16 July 2006 with an open day.

In 2006 the park won a Green Flag Award.  This is awarded for reaching the English and Welsh national standard for parks and green spaces.

Gallery

References

External links 

 Tourism and Information Website
 Location and history of park
 Friends of Rowntree Park
Rowntree Park Tennis Club

Urban public parks
Parks and commons in York